Carola Hits 2 is a Greatest Hits album by Swedish singer Carola Häggkvist. It was released on 27 November 1996 in Sweden and Norway.

Track listing
"Believe"
"Save Me"
"Just The Way You Are"
"Säg mig var du står" ("Why Tell Me Why")
"Hunger"
"Ännu en dag"
"Thunder and Lightning"
"Gjord av sten"
"Vilken värld det ska bli"
"Brand New Heart"
"Spread Your Wings (For Your Love)"
"Every Beat of My Heart"
"All the Reasons to Live"
"Save the Children"
"Oh Happy Day"
"Guld i dina ögon"
"Det kommer dagar"
"Mixade minnen"

Release history

Charts

References

1991 greatest hits albums
Carola Häggkvist albums